The 81st Regiment Illinois Volunteer Infantry was an infantry regiment that served in the Union Army during the American Civil War.

Service
The 81st Illinois Infantry was organized at Anna, Illinois and mustered into Federal service on August 21, 1862.

The regiment was mustered out on August 5, 1865.

Total strength and casualties
The regiment suffered 8 officers and 66 enlisted men who were killed in action or who died of their wounds and 3 officers and 292 enlisted men who died of disease, for a total of 369 fatalities.

Commanders
 Colonel James J. Dollins - Killed in action at the Siege of Vicksburg, May 22, 1863.
 Colonel Franklin Campbell -  Resigned August 20, 1864.
 Lieutenant Colonel Andrew W. Rogers - Mustered out with the regiment.

See also
List of Illinois Civil War Units
Illinois in the American Civil War

Notes

References
The Civil War Archive

Units and formations of the Union Army from Illinois
1862 establishments in Illinois
Military units and formations established in 1862
Military units and formations disestablished in 1865